"Longtemps" is a song performed by French-Israeli singer Amir Haddad. The song was released as a digital download on 17 August 2018 as the lead single from his re-released third studio album Addictions. The song has charted in Belgium.

Commercial performance
On 15 September 2018, the song entered the Ultratop 50 Wallonia chart at number 35, peaking at number 14.  At the annual Fête de la Musique in Nîmes, the song won the 2019 Chanson de l'Année prize, giving Amir his second victory in three years as he had previously won the 2017 prize for "On dirait".

Music video
A music video to accompany the release of "Longtemps" was first released onto YouTube on 17 August 2018 at a total length of three minutes and thirty-nine seconds.

Track listing

Charts

Weekly charts

Year-end charts

Certifications

Release history

References

2018 songs
2018 singles
Amir Haddad songs
Songs written by Nazim Khaled